Lug is a municipality in Südwestpfalz district, in Rhineland-Palatinate, western Germany.

References

Kashofen
Palatinate Forest
South Palatinate
Südwestpfalz
Palatinate (region)